Pitt County Schools is a school system located in Pitt County, North Carolina.  The central office is located in Greenville.  It operates one pre-kindergarten school, 16 elementary schools, six K–8, seven middle schools and six high schools.

Schools

High schools
 Ayden-Grifton High School
 D. H. Conley High School
Early College High School
Farmville Central High
Innovation Early College High
 Junius H. Rose High School
 North Pitt High School
 South Central High School

Middle schools
A G Cox Middle
Ayden Middle
C M Eppes Middle
E B Aycock Middle
Farmville Middle
H B Sugg Elementary
Hope Middle
Wellcome Middle
Wintergreen Intermediate
Wintergreen Primary

Elementary schools
Ayden Elementary
Belvoir Elementary
Bethel Elementary
Chicod
Creekside Elementary
Eastern Elementary
Elmhurst Elementary
Falkland Elementary
G R Whitfield
Grifton
Lakeforest Elementary
Northwest Elementary
Pactolus
Ridgewood Elementary
Sam D Bundy Elementary
South Greenville Elementary
Stokes
W H Robinson Elementary
Wahl Coates Elementary

Other
Vidant Health (1-12)

References

Education in Pitt County, North Carolina
School districts in North Carolina